The Mist is a psychological horror novella by American author Stephen King. First published by Viking Press in 1980 as part of the Dark Forces anthology, an edited version was subsequently included in King's 1985 collection Skeleton Crew. In the story, the small town of Bridgton, Maine is shrouded in a dense mist that conceals otherworldly creatures. The protagonist and narrator David Drayton, who has taken refuge with his young son in a supermarket, tries to survive against not only the creatures of the mist, but also fanatical aggression from other survivors. In The Mist, King addresses the themes of man-made fears and religious fundamentalism.

King was inspired to write The Mist by a trip to his local supermarket following a thunderstorm, during which he imagined prehistoric animals and giant insects besieging the building. The Mist was nominated for a World Fantasy Award and a Locus Award in 1981, and critics have considered it to be one of King's iconic works and a classic in its genre. Some reviewers lamented the superficial explanation of the mist's nature, while others were pleased with the cinematic presentation. A film adaptation directed by Frank Darabont was released in 2007, and a television series based on the novella's premise aired on Spike in 2017.

Plot
The morning after a severe thunderstorm left the area without electrical power, an unnaturally thick and straight-edged cloud of mist spreads toward the small town of Bridgton, Maine, at first looking to be part of the distant white clouds overhead. Local speculation suggests the mist may have originated at a secretive nearby military installation, long rumored to house something called "the Arrowhead Project." One theory holds that the previous night's storm disrupted experiments the facility was conducting; the installation and the communities closest to it have not been heard from since before the storm started.

Commercial artist David Drayton, along with his young son Billy and neighbor Brent Norton (whose prized vintage car has been smashed by a fallen tree), go to the local supermarket for groceries, leaving David's wife behind at their home. The mist-edge soon arrives at the supermarket, blotting out the sun, followed by an earthquake-like jolt. When a young bagger, Norm, goes outside to fix a clogged vent in the store's generator, he is dragged into the mist by a mass of giant tentacles. David and assistant manager Ollie Weeks witness Norm's death and try to convince the remaining survivors of what has happened, imploring that no one leave the store. Norton and a small group of people accuse David of lying and go outside for help, but only make it a short distance across the parking lot before all of them are attacked and killed by unnatural predatory creatures. Ollie is given a revolver by the young Amanda Dumfries; she and David also have passionless stress-induced sex.

Large "insects" begin crawling over the outside of the store, attracting pterosaur-like creatures, one of which squirms inside through a broken window and is killed with an improvised torch amidst a general panic. David leads a group of people to an adjacent pharmacy as a test of possibly escaping the situation, as well as to retrieve medicine for an elderly woman who was injured as panicked survivors ran for the back of the store when the winged creatures got in. At the pharmacy, Drayton and his companions encounter huge spider-like creatures that- due to the loss of power- got in through the pharmacy's propped-open doors and killed everyone inside. The spiders and other creatures from the mist attack and while the expedition makes it back to the market, they lose almost half their members in the retreat, heavily demoralizing everyone else inside the store.

As these events progress, the elderly religious fanatic Mrs.Carmody, formerly regarded as an erratic crackpot by most of the community, gradually convinces a majority of the remaining survivors that current events fulfill a biblical prophecy of the end time, and that human sacrifice is required to save themselves from God's wrath. Under the sustained extreme stress and unable to deal with what has happened, most within the market take to Mrs. Carmody's explanations as their sanity erodes and she continues to confidently offer answers.

When David, Billy, Ollie, Amanda and a few other survivors attempt to escape to David's car, they are confronted by Mrs.Carmody, who calls on the crowd to offer Billy and Amanda as sacrifices. Ollie shoots Mrs.Carmody, who with her final words tells David's group "You will all die out there." With their leader dead, the "congregation" dissolves in confusion. En route to the car, Ollie and one other survivor are killed, while another flees back to the store. The rest attempt to reach David's house to determine the fate of his wife, but the driveway is hopelessly blocked with fallen trees. They drive south through a devastated and mist-shrouded New England, witnessing further signs of catastrophe and more creatures of unknown origin. While stopped for the night, David searches the radio bands and, through the mist's interference, possibly hears someone say "Hartford", giving him a last shred of hope.

Influences
King, in the Notes section in Skeleton Crew, says The Mist was inspired by a real-life experience, when a massive thunderstorm much like the one that opens the story occurred where King lived at the time. The day after the storm, he went to a local supermarket with his son. While looking for hot dog buns, King imagined a "big prehistoric flying reptile" flapping around in the store. By the time the two were in line to pay for their purchases, King had the basis for his story: survivors trapped in a supermarket surrounded by unknown creatures.

While experiencing the unusual spring weather which precedes the storm, some characters make reference to the real-life Great Blizzard of 1888, which devastated much of the northeastern United States.

Influence in other media

Film
A film adaptation of the novella, titled The Mist (2007), was directed by Frank Darabont and starred Thomas Jane. This adaptation changes the ending: the survivors agree to commit suicide after seeing the mist seemingly overrun New England. David Drayton kills the others, including his son. However, he is unable to kill himself because he is out of bullets. As he steps out of the car to await his fate, the mist begins to disperse to reveal a US Army convoy approaching, destroying the remaining creatures and assisting survivors. David falls to his knees, realizing that they were only moments from rescue.

Games
 In 1985, Mindscape released an interactive fiction computer game based on the novella.
The developers of the Half-Life video game series, which also deals with creatures from parallel dimensions breaking through to ours, have listed The Mist among their primary influences for the game plot. The first game in the series was originally going to be called Quiver, as a reference to the Arrowhead Project from The Mist.
The Silent Hill video game series bears many similarities to The Mist. Series composer and producer Akira Yamaoka has cited the novella as a "great source of inspiration" for the development of the original Silent Hill game.

Television adaptation
 The Mist, a television series based on the novel, premiered on Spike on June 22, 2017. The series features cast members Morgan Spector, Alyssa Sutherland, Gus Birney, Danica Curcic and Frances Conroy.  Spike cancelled the series on September 27, 2017, after just one season.

See also
 Stephen King short fiction bibliography
 The Fog (1975), a novel by James Herbert
 The Fog (1980), a horror film directed by John Carpenter
 Under the Dome, a 2009 novel by Stephen King

References 

1980 short stories
Apocalyptic novels
Novellas by Stephen King
American novels adapted into films
American novels adapted into television shows
Novels set in Maine